Stefano Comini (born 3 February 1990) is a Swiss racing driver.

Career

Karting
Comini debuted in karting in 2002, racing mostly in Italian and Swiss championships, taking titles in the Bridgestone Cup Switzerland ICA in 2004 and 2005 respectively.

Early career & Formula Renault
Comini began his single-seaters stage of his career in 2006, racing in the Formula Monza 1.2 with Fadini Corse. He won one from seven races that he competed to finish the season on the tenth position.

The following year, Comini moved to the 1.6 category of that series, driving with MG Motorsport. He finished third overall in that year with four wins. He also contested four races of the Formule Renault 2.0 Suisse and two races of the Italian Formula Renault Winter Series.

In 2008, Comini moved to the Italian Formula Renault Championship, racing for Team Dueppì and CO2 Motorsport. He finished seventeenth in the series standings. He again competed in four races of the Formule Renault 2.0 Suisse championship and one race in the final round of the season at Monza.

For 2009, he had double campaign in both the Italian and Swiss Formula Renault 2.0 championships. He failed to score win in any of the championships, but collected three podiums to finish sixth in Italian Championship and seventh in Swiss Championship. In 2010, he competed his final formula races in the Formula Abarth round at Monza.

Sports and touring car racing
After three races in 2009 in VLN Endurance, Comini made his debut in Eurocup Mégane Trophy for Oregon Team. He won three from thirteen races, finishing season third behind Nick Catsburg and Pierre Thiriet.

He remained in the series for Eurocup Mégane Trophy with the same team. He dominated the season, winning all but three races of the season.

For 2012, he moved to the Italian Renault Clio Cup, competing for Composit Motorsport. He achieved five wins to grab the championship title after the first attempt.

Next year he spent in the Renault Clio Cup Bohemia. He scored four wins at Hockenheim, Nürburgring and Brno, but finished just fifth in the series standings.

In 2014, he joined SEAT León Eurocup with Target Competition. He bookended the season with wins at Nürburgring and Barcelona, also he won a reverse-grid race at Silverstone, tying-up with Julien Briché with 58 points.

Comini will take part in the new-for-2015 TCR International Series, joining Target Competition.

Racing record

Career summary

† As Comini was a guest driver, he was ineligible to score points.

Complete TCR International Series results
(key) (Races in bold indicate pole position) (Races in italics indicate fastest lap)

Complete TCR Europe Series results
(key) (Races in bold indicate pole position) (Races in italics indicate fastest lap)

References

External links
  
 

1990 births
Living people
Swiss racing drivers
Sportspeople from Lugano
Italian Formula Renault 1.6 drivers
Italian Formula Renault 2.0 drivers
Formula Renault 2.0 Alps drivers
Eurocup Mégane Trophy drivers
Formula Abarth drivers
Porsche Supercup drivers
SEAT León Eurocup drivers
TCR International Series drivers
W Racing Team drivers
Comtoyou Racing drivers
TCR Europe Touring Car Series drivers
Lamborghini Super Trofeo drivers